The 2003 William & Mary Tribe football team represented the College of William & Mary as member of the Atlantic 10 Conference (A-10) during the 2003 NCAA Division I-AA football season. Led by Jimmye Laycock in his 24th year as head coach, William & Mary finished the season with an overall record of 5–5 and a mark of 4–4 in A-10 play, tying for fifth place.

William & Mary only played 10 games due to a cancellation of a game against Maine, which had been scheduled for September 27. The presidents of the A-10 awarded Maine a victory and William & Mary a no-contest as a result of the cancellation of their game. The decision of the presidents, based upon the recommendation of the league's directors of athletics, was unprecedented in A-10 history. Factored into the decision were Maine's efforts to play the game and the understanding of the unique circumstances facing William & Mary in the aftermath of Hurricane Isabel. However, the NCAA does not recognize the win in their official records.

Schedule

References

William and Mary
William & Mary Tribe football seasons
William and Mary Indians football